U.S. Route 24 (US-24) in the state of Kansas runs east–west across the northern half of the state for . The route mostly connects rural communities across the High Plains of Kansas, while also later providing an interstate alternate between Topeka, Lawrence, and Kansas City. US 24 both enters and exits the state running concurrently with Interstate 70 (I-70). Along with US 40, the road has largely been replaced by the more modern Interstate in its functionality as a long-distance route.

Route description
US-24 enters the state from Colorado concurrent with I-70 southwest of Kanorado, Kansas. For its first , the route runs concurrently with the Interstate, passing Goodland and Brewster. This is despite the fact that former alignment remains intact, albeit largely as a local road. The exception to this rule is a business route through downtown Goodland.

South-southwest of Levant, US-24 splits from the Interstate and begins heading northeastward before eastward and into Colby. The route passes through the northern side of town, intersecting K-25 before continuing east. Towards the Thomas–Sheridan county line, US 24 intersects US-83 in an extremely rural setting southeast of the town of Gem. The route continues through Sheridan, Graham, and Rooks counties, passing through the towns of Hoxie, Hill City, and Stockton and intersecting K-23, US-283, K-18, and US-183. US-24 also passes by several other smaller communities, such as Menlo and Morland, connecting to those towns via secondary state highways. Additionally, the route passes around the northern edge of the Webster Reservoir in western Rooks County.

In Osborne, the highway joins US-281 and begins heading northward. South of Portis, US-24 leaves US-281 and returns to an eastward trajectory, picking up a concurrency with K-9 in the process. The route passes through Downs and Cawker City, around Waconda Lake, and into Beloit. In Beloit, it junctions K-14, before K-9 splits toward the east as US-24 begins a southeastward run to Glasco, where it returns to an eastward trajectory. East of that town, the route crosses US-81 in another rural setting. US-24 continues through Clay County and Clay Center and into Riley County. 

Shortly after Leonardville, US-24 takes a sharp rightward turn before intersecting US-77 on the north side of Riley, returning to an eastward direction and running concurrently. The routes split shortly thereafter as US-24 begins heading southeast toward Manhattan. The route passes around the city to the northeast and east sides, before splitting away from town at K-177 and heading across the Big Blue River and into Pottawatomie County.

US-24 runs across the southern edge of the county parallel to the Kansas River, passing through Wamego, Belvue, and St. Marys. Entering Shawnee, the county begins heading southeastward toward Topeka via Rossville and Silver Lake. US-24 passes across the northern end of Topeka as a hybrid limited-access road, with four interchanges in and around the city, including ones with US-75 and K-4, with a short concurrency between interchanges with the last route. US-24 continues eastward, paralleling the Kansas River through Jefferson County, passing through Grantville and Perry, then picking up a concurrency with US-59 north of Williamstown. The routes then turn south toward Lawrence, with US-24 splitting to the east and gaining a concurrency with US-40 on the north side of the city as US-59 and US-40 west head south towards downtown. US-24/US-40 heads northeast toward Tonganoxie, where it turns east once again. On the Kansas City–Bonner Springs city line, the two routes intersect US-73 and K-7 at a cloverleaf interchange, where US-24/US-40 joins US-73/K-7 southward toward I-70 and Bonner Springs. At I-70, US-24 and US-40 join the Interstate Highway eastward, while US-73 ends and K-7 continues southward into the core of Bonner Springs. US-24 continues with I-70 into Kansas City and across the Kansas River into Kansas City, Missouri.

History

When the United States Numbered Highway System was first instituted in 1926, much of what is now US-24 was designated as U.S. Route 40N (US-40N). US-40N ran along present-day US-24 between Limon, Colorado and Manhattan. At Manhattan, it and US-40S recombined into US-40, which used the present alignment of US-24 eastward toward Topeka. Between Topeka and Lawrence, K-10 occupied the current alignment of US-24 as US-40 used its still standing alignment on the south side of the Kansas River. At Lawrence, US-40 returned to using US-24's alignment onto Kansas City and Missouri. In 1935, US-40N was decommissioned and US-24 was extended westward from its previous terminus at Independence across the state into Colorado and eventually on to Grand Junction, Colorado (later reduced to Minturn, Colorado).

Major junctions

References

External links

 Kansas
Transportation in Sherman County, Kansas
Transportation in Thomas County, Kansas
Transportation in Sheridan County, Kansas
Transportation in Graham County, Kansas
Transportation in Rooks County, Kansas
Transportation in Osborne County, Kansas
Transportation in Mitchell County, Kansas
Transportation in Cloud County, Kansas
Transportation in Clay County, Kansas
Transportation in Riley County, Kansas
Transportation in Pottawatomie County, Kansas
Transportation in Shawnee County, Kansas
Transportation in Jefferson County, Kansas
Transportation in Douglas County, Kansas
Transportation in Leavenworth County, Kansas
Transportation in Wyandotte County, Kansas
24